Alexander Sulkhanishvili (1808 in Tbilisi – ?) was a Georgian translator and calligrapher of the 19th century.

In 1825 he rewrote the works of Sulkhan-Saba Orbeliani. He also spoke Russian, Persian and Turkish languages. In 1828 he translated from Persian to Georgian the work of the 15th-century poet Panah, Bakhtiarnameh. From the 1840s Sulkhanishvili lived in Saint Petersburg. In 1839 he published a Georgian-French-Russian dictionary.

References
Georgian Soviet Encyclopedia, ტ. 9, გვ. 602–603, თბ., 1985
გვახარია ა., სპარსული ხალხური დასთანების ქართული ვერსიები, I — ბახთირ-ნამე, თბ., 1968
რუხაძე ტ., ქართული ეპოსი „გარდამავალი ხანის“ ლიტერატურაში, თბ., 1939

Calligraphers from Georgia (country)
1808 births
Translators from Georgia (country)
19th-century people from Georgia (country)
Writers from Tbilisi
Year of death missing
19th-century writers from Georgia (country)
19th-century translators